Egypt, Texas may refer to:

Egypt, Leon County, Texas
Egypt, Montgomery County, Texas
Egypt, Wharton County, Texas
Little Egypt, Texas, in Dallas County